Ultrapure water (UPW), high-purity water or highly purified water (HPW) is water that has been purified to uncommonly stringent specifications. Ultrapure water is a term commonly used in manufacturing to emphasize the fact that the water is treated to the highest levels of purity for all contaminant types, including: organic and inorganic compounds; dissolved and particulate matter; volatile and non-volatile; reactive, and inert; hydrophilic and hydrophobic; and dissolved gases.

UPW and the commonly used term deionized (DI) water are not the same. In addition to the fact that UPW has organic particles and dissolved gases removed, a typical UPW system has three stages: a pretreatment stage to produce purified water, a primary stage to further purify the water, and a polishing stage, the most expensive part of the treatment process.

A number of organizations and groups develop and publish standards associated with the production of UPW.  For microelectronics and power, they include Semiconductor Equipment and Materials International (SEMI) (microelectronics and photovoltaic), American Society for Testing and Materials International (ASTM International) (semiconductor, power), Electric Power Research Institute (EPRI) (power), American Society of Mechanical Engineers (ASME) (power), and International Association for the Properties of Water and Steam (IAPWS) (power). Pharmaceutical plants follow water quality standards as developed by pharmacopeias, of which three examples are the United States Pharmacopeia, European Pharmacopeia, and Japanese Pharmacopeia.

The most widely used requirements for UPW quality are documented by ASTM D5127 "Standard Guide for Ultra-Pure Water Used in the Electronics and Semiconductor Industries" and SEMI F63 "Guide for ultrapure water used in semiconductor processing".

Ultra pure water is also used as boiler feedwater in the UK AGR fleet.

Sources and control
Bacteria, particles, organic, and inorganic sources of contamination vary depending on a number of factors, including the feed water to make UPW, as well as the selection of the piping materials used to convey it. Bacteria are typically reported in colony-forming units (CFU) per volume of UPW. Particles use number per volume of UPW. Total organic carbon (TOC), metallic contaminants, and anionic contaminants are measured in dimensionless terms of parts per notation, such as ppm, ppb, ppt, and ppq.

Bacteria have been referred to as one of the most obstinate in this list to control. Techniques that help to minimize bacterial colony growth within UPW streams include occasional chemical or steam sanitization (which is common in the pharmaceutical industry), ultrafiltration (found in some pharmaceutical, but mostly semiconductor industries), ozonation, and optimization of piping system designs that promote the use of Reynolds Number criteria for minimum flow, along with minimization of dead legs. In modern and advanced UPW systems, positive (higher than zero) bacteria counts are typically observed on newly constructed facilities. This issue is effectively addressed by sanitization using ozone or hydrogen peroxide. With proper design of the polishing and distribution system, no positive bacteria counts are typically detected throughout the life cycle of the UPW system.

Particles in UPW are the bane of the semiconductor industry, causing defects in sensitive photolithographic processes that define nanometer-sized features. In other industries, their effects can range from a nuisance to life-threatening defects. Particles can be controlled by filtration and ultrafiltration. Sources can include bacterial fragments, the sloughing of the component walls within the conduit's wetted stream, and the cleanliness of the jointing processes used to build the piping system.

Total organic carbon in ultra pure water can contribute to bacterial proliferation by providing nutrients, can substitute as a carbide for another chemical species in a sensitive thermal process, react in unwanted ways with biochemical reactions in bioprocessing, and, in severe cases, leave unwanted residues on production parts. TOC can come from the feed water used to produce UPW, from the components used to convey the UPW (additives in the manufacturing piping products or extrusion aides and mold release agents), from subsequent manufacturing and cleaning operations of piping systems, or from dirty pipes, fittings, and valves.

Metallic and anionic contamination in UPW systems can shut down enzymatic processes in bioprocessing, corrode equipment in the electrical power generation industry, and result in either short or long-term failure of electronic components in semiconductor chips and photovoltaic cells. Its sources are similar to those of TOC's. Depending on the level of purity needed, detection of these contaminants can range from simple conductivity (electrolytic) readings to sophisticated instrumentation such as ion chromatography (IC), atomic absorption spectroscopy (AA) and inductively coupled plasma mass spectrometry (ICP-MS).

Applications
Ultrapure water is treated through multiple steps to meet the quality standards for different users.

The primary industries using UPW are:

 semiconductor devices fabrication process
 solar photovoltaics
 pharmaceuticals
 power generation (sub and super critical boilers)
 specialty applications such as research laboratories.

The term "ultrapure water" became popular in the late 1970s and early 1980s to describe the particular quality of water used by these industries.

While each industry uses what it calls "ultrapure water", the quality standards vary, meaning that the UPW used by a pharmaceutical plant is different from that used in a semiconductor fab or a power station. The standards are based on the application. For instance, semiconductor plants use UPW as a cleaning agent, so it is important that the water not contain dissolved contaminants that can precipitate or particles that may lodge on circuits and cause microchip failures. The power industry uses UPW to make steam to drive steam turbines; pharmaceutical facilities use UPW as a cleaning agent, as well as an ingredient in products, so they seek water free of endotoxins, microbials, and viruses.

Today, ion exchange (IX) and electrodeionization (EDI) are the primary deionization technologies associated with UPW production, in most cases following reverse osmosis (RO). Depending on the required water quality, UPW treatment plants often also feature degasification, microfiltration, ultrafiltration, ultraviolet irradiation, and measurement instruments (e.g., total organic carbon [TOC], resistivity/conductivity, particles, pH, and specialty measurements for specific ions).

Early on, softened water produced by technologies like zeolite softening or cold lime softening was a precursor to modern UPW treatment. From there, the term "deionized" water was the next advancement as synthetic IX resins were invented in 1935 and then became commercialized in the 1940s. The earliest "deionized" water systems relied on IX treatment to produce "high-purity" as determined by resistivity or conductivity measurements. After commercial RO membranes emerged in the 1960s, RO use with IX treatment eventually became common. EDI was commercialized in the 1980s and this technology has now become commonly associated with UPW treatment.

Applications in semiconductor industry
UPW is used extensively in the semiconductor industry where the highest grade of purity is required. The amount of electronic-grade or molecular-grade water used by the semiconductor industry is comparable to the water consumption of a small city; a single factory can utilize ultrapure water (UPW) at a rate of 2 MGD, or ~5500 m3/day. The UPW is usually produced on-site.

The use of UPW varies; it may be used to rinse the wafer after application of chemicals, to dilute the chemicals themselves, in optics systems for immersion photolithography, or as make-up to cooling fluid in some critical applications. UPW is even sometimes used as a humidification source for the cleanroom environment.

The primary, and most critical, application of UPW is in wafer cleaning in and after wet etching step during the FEOL stage. Impurities which can cause product contamination or impact process efficiency (e.g. etch rate) must be removed from the water during cleaning and etching stage. In chemical-mechanical polishing processes, water is used in addition to reagents and abrasive particles. As of 2002 1-2 parts of contaminating molecules per one million of water ones was considered to be an "ultrapure water" (e.g. semiconductor grade). 

Water quality standards for use in the semiconductor industry

	
It is used in other types of electronics manufacturing in a similar fashion, such as flat panel displays, discrete components (such as LEDs), hard disk drive platters (HDD) and solid-state drive NAND flash (SSD), image sensors and image processors/ wafer-level optics (WLO), and crystalline silicon photovoltaics; the cleanliness requirements in the semiconductor industry, however, are currently the most stringent.

Applications in pharmaceutical industry
A typical use of ultrapure water in pharmaceutical and biotechnology industries is summarized in the table below:

Uses of ultrapure water in the pharmaceutical and biotechnology industries

In order to be used for pharmaceutical and biotechnology applications for production of licensed human and veterinary health care products it must comply with the specification of the following pharmacopeias monographs:

 British Pharmacopoeia (BP): Purified water
 Japanese Pharmacopoeia (JP): Purified water
 European Pharmacopoeia (Ph Eur): Aqua purificata
 The United States Pharmacopoeia (USP): Purified water
Note: Purified Water is typically a main monograph which references other applications that use Ultrapure water
 
Ultrapure water is often used as a critical utility for cleaning applications (as required). It is also used to generate clean steam for sterilization.

The following table summarizes the specifications of two major pharmacopoeias for 'water for injection':

Pharmacopoeia specifications for water for injection

Ultrapure water and deionized water validation

Ultrapure water validation must utilize a risk-based lifecycle approach. This approach consists of three stages – design and development, qualification, and continued verification. One should utilize current regulatory guidance to comply with regulatory expectations. Typical guidance documents to consult at the time of writing are: FDA Guide to Inspections of High Purity Water Systems, High Purity Water Systems (7/93), the EMEA CPMP/CVMP Note for Guidance on Quality of Water for Pharmaceutical Use (London, 2002), and USP Monograph <1231> Water For Pharmaceutical Purposes. 
However, other jurisdictions' documents may exist, and it is a responsibility of practitioners validating water systems to consult those. Currently, the World Health Organization (WHO)  as well as the Pharmaceutical Inspection Co-operation Scheme (PIC/S)  developed technical documents which outline validation requirements and strategies for water systems.

Analytical methods and techniques

On-line analytical measurements

Conductivity/resistivity

In pure water systems, electrolytic conductivity or resistivity measurement is the most common indicator of ionic contamination. The same basic measurement is read out in either conductivity units of microsiemens per centimeter (μS/cm), typical of the pharmaceutical and power industries or in resistivity units of megohm-centimeters (MΩ⋅cm) used in the microelectronics industries. These units are reciprocals of each other. Absolutely pure water has a conductivity of 0.05501 μS/cm and a resistivity of 18.18 MΩ⋅cm at 25 °C, the most common reference temperature to which these measurements are compensated. An example of the sensitivity to contamination of these measurements is that 0.1 ppb of sodium chloride raises the conductivity of pure water to 0.05523 μS/cm and lowers the resistivity to 18.11 MΩ⋅cm.

Ultrapure water is easily contaminated by traces of carbon dioxide from the atmosphere passing through tiny leaks or diffusing through thin wall polymer tubing when sample lines are used for measurement. Carbon dioxide forms conductive carbonic acid in water. For this reason, conductivity probes are most often permanently inserted directly into the main ultrapure water system piping to provide real-time continuous monitoring of contamination. These probes contain both conductivity and temperature sensors to enable accurate compensation for the very large temperature influence on the conductivity of pure waters. Conductivity probes have an operating life of many years in pure water systems. They require no maintenance except for periodic verification of measurement accuracy, typically annually.

Sodium

Sodium is usually the first ion to break through a depleted cation exchanger. Sodium measurement can quickly detect this condition and is widely used as the indicator for cation exchange regeneration. The conductivity of cation exchange effluent is always quite high due to the presence of anions and hydrogen ion and therefore conductivity measurement is not useful for this purpose. Sodium is also measured in power plant water and steam samples because it is a common corrosive contaminant and can be detected at very low concentrations in the presence of higher amounts of ammonia and/or amine treatment which have a relatively high background conductivity.

On-line sodium measurement in ultrapure water most commonly uses a glass membrane sodium ion-selective electrode and a reference electrode in an analyzer measuring a small continuously flowing side-stream sample. The voltage measured between the electrodes is proportional to the logarithm of the sodium ion activity or concentration, according to the Nernst equation. Because of the logarithmic response, low concentrations in sub-parts per billion ranges can be measured routinely. To prevent interference from hydrogen ion, the sample pH is raised by the continuous addition of a pure amine before measurement. Calibration at low concentrations is often done with automated analyzers to save time and to eliminate variables of manual calibration.

Dissolved oxygen

Advanced microelectronics manufacturing processes require low single digit to 10 ppb dissolved oxygen (DO) concentrations in the ultrapure rinse water to prevent oxidation of wafer films and layers. DO in power plant water and steam must be controlled to ppb levels to minimize corrosion. Copper alloy components in power plants require single digit ppb DO concentrations whereas iron alloys can benefit from the passivation effects of higher concentrations in the 30 to 150 ppb range.

Dissolved oxygen is measured by two basic technologies: electrochemical cell or optical fluorescence. Traditional electrochemical measurement uses a sensor with a gas-permeable membrane. Behind the membrane, electrodes immersed in an electrolyte develop an electric current directly proportional to the oxygen partial pressure of the sample. The signal is temperature compensated for the oxygen solubility in water, the electrochemical cell output and the diffusion rate of oxygen through the membrane.

Optical fluorescent DO sensors use a light source, a fluorophore and an optical detector. The fluorophore is immersed in the sample. Light is directed at the fluorophore which absorbs energy and then re-emits light at a longer wavelength. The duration and intensity of the re-emitted light is related to the dissolved oxygen partial pressure by the Stern–Volmer relationship. The signal is temperature compensated for the solubility of oxygen in water and the fluorophore characteristics to obtain the DO concentration value.

Silica

Silica is a contaminant that is detrimental to microelectronics processing and must be maintained at sub-ppb levels. In steam power generation silica can form deposits on heat-exchange surfaces where it reduces thermal efficiency. In high temperature boilers, silica will volatilize and carry over with steam where it can form deposits on turbine blades which lower aerodynamic efficiency. Silica deposits are very difficult to remove. Silica is the first readily measurable species to be released by a spent anion exchange resin and is therefore used as the trigger for anion resin regeneration. Silica is non-conductive and therefore not detectable by conductivity.

Silica is measured on side stream samples with colorimetric analyzers.  The measurement adds reagents including a molybdate compound and a reducing agent to produce a blue silico-molybdate complex color which is detected optically and is related to concentration according to the Beer–Lambert law. Most silica analyzers operate on an automated semi-continuous basis, isolating a small volume of sample, adding reagents sequentially and allowing enough time for reactions to occur while minimizing consumption of reagents. The display and output signals are updated with each batch measurement result, typically at 10 to 20-minute intervals.

Particles

Particles in UPW have always presented a major problem for semiconductor manufacture, as any particle landing on a silicon wafer can bridge the gap between the electrical pathways in the semiconductor circuitry. When a pathway is short-circuited the semiconductor device will not work properly; such a failure is called a yield loss, one of the most closely watched parameters in the semiconductor industry. The technique of choice to detect these single particles has been to shine a light beam (a laser) through a small volume of UPW and detect the light scattered by any particles (instruments based on this technique are called laser particle counters or LPCs). As semiconductor manufacturers pack more and more transistors into the same physical space, the circuitry line-width has become narrow and narrower. As a result, LPC manufacturers have had to use more and more powerful lasers and very sophisticated scattered light detectors to keep pace. As line-width approaches 10 nm (a human hair is approximately 100,000 nm in diameter) LPC technology is becoming limited by secondary optical effects, and new particle measurement techniques will be required. Recently, one such novel analysis method named NDLS has successfully been brought into use at Electrum Laboratory (Royal Institute of Technology) in Stockholm, Sweden. NDLS is based on Dynamic Light Scattering (DLS) instrumentation.

Non-volatile residue

Another type of contamination in UPW is dissolved inorganic material, primarily silica. Silica is one of the most abundant mineral on the planet and is found in all water supplies. Any dissolved inorganic material has the potential to remain on the wafer as the UPW dries. Once again this can lead to a significant loss in yield. To detect trace amounts of dissolved inorganic material a measurement of non-volatile residue is commonly used. This technique involves using a nebulizer to create droplets of UPW suspended in a stream of air. These droplets are dried at a high temperature to produce an aerosol of non-volatile residue particles. A measurement device called a condensation particle counter then counts the residue particles to give a reading in parts per trillion (ppt) by weight.

TOC

Total organic carbon is most commonly measured by oxidizing the organics in the water to CO, measuring the increase in the CO concentration after the oxidation or delta CO, and converting the measured delta CO amount into "mass of carbon" per volume concentration units.  The initial CO in the water sample is defined as Inorganic Carbon or IC.  The CO produced from the oxidized organics and any initial CO (IC) both together are defined as Total Carbon or TC.  The TOC value is then equal to the difference between TC and IC.

Organic oxidation methods for TOC analysis

Oxidation of organics to CO is most commonly achieved in liquid solutions by the creation of the highly oxidizing chemical species, the hydroxyl radical (OH•).  Organic oxidation in a combustion environment involves the creation of other energized molecular oxygen species.  For the typical TOC levels in UPW systems most methods utilize hydroxyl radicals in the liquid phase.

There are multiple methods to create sufficient concentrations of hydroxyl radicals needed to completely oxidize the organics in water to CO, each method being appropriate for different water purity levels.  For typical raw waters feeding into the front end of an UPW purification system the raw water can contain TOC levels between 0.7 mg/L to 15 mg/L and require a robust oxidation method that can ensure there is enough oxygen available to completely convert all the carbon atoms in the organic molecules into CO.  Robust oxidation methods that supply sufficient oxygen include the following methods; Ultraviolet light (UV) & persulfate, heated persulfate, combustion, and super critical oxidation.  Typical equations showing persulfate generation of hydroxyl radicals follows.

 + hν (254 nm)   →    2 •   and    • +   →    + OH •

When the organic concentration is less than 1 mg/L as TOC and the water is saturated with oxygen UV light is sufficient to oxidize the organics to CO, this is a simpler oxidation method.  The wavelength of the UV light for the lower TOC waters must be less than 200 nm and is typically 184 nm generated by a low pressure Hg vapor lamp. The 184 nm UV light is energetic enough to break the water molecule into OH and H radicals.  The hydrogen radicals quickly react to create H.   The equations follow:

HO + hν (185 nm)   →    OH• + H • and  H • + H •   →    H

Different types of UPW TOC Analyzers

IC (Inorganic Carbon) =  +  + 

TC (Total Carbon) = Organic Carbon + IC

TOC (Total Organic Carbon) = TC – IC

HO + hν (185 nm)   →    OH• + H •

 + hν (254 nm)   →    2  •

 • +   →    + OH •

Offline lab analysis
When testing the quality of UPW, consideration is given to where that quality is required and where it is to be measured. The point of distribution or delivery (POD) is the point in the system immediately after the last treatment step and before the distribution loop. It is the standard location for the majority of analytical tests.  The point of connection (POC) is another commonly used point for measuring quality of UPW.  It is located at the outlet of the submain or lateral take off valve used for UPW supply to the tool.

Grab sample UPW analyses are either complementary to the on-line testing or alternative, depending on the availability of the instruments and the level of the UPW quality specifications. Grab sample analysis is typically performed for the following parameters: metals, anions, ammonium, silica (both dissolved and total), particles by SEM (scanning electron microscope), TOC (total organic compounds) and specific organic compounds.

Metal analyses are typically performed by ICP-MS (Inductively coupled plasma mass spectrometry). The detection level depends on the specific type of the instrument used and the method of the sample preparation and handling.  Current state-of-the-art methods allow reaching sub-ppt (parts per trillion) level (< 1 ppt) typically tested by ICPMS.

The anion analysis for seven most common inorganic anions (sulfate, chloride, fluoride, phosphate, nitrite, nitrate, and bromide) is performed by ion chromatography (IC), reaching single digit ppt detection limits.  IC is also used to analyze ammonia and other metal cations. However ICPMS is the preferred method for metals due to lower detection limits and its ability to detect both dissolved and non-dissolved metals in UPW.  IC is also used for the detection of urea in UPW down to the 0.5 ppb level. Urea is one of the more common contaminants in UPW and probably the most difficult for treatment.

Silica analysis in UPW typically includes determination of reactive and total silica. Due to the complexity of silica chemistry, the form of silica measured is defined by the photometric (colorimetric) method as molybdate-reactive silica. Those forms of silica that are molybdate-reactive include dissolved simple silicates, monomeric silica and silicic acid, and an undetermined fraction of polymeric silica. Total silica determination in water employs high resolution ICPMS, GFAA (graphite furnace atomic absorption), and the photometric method combined with silica digestion.  For many natural waters, a measurement of molybdate-reactive silica by this test method provides a close approximation of total silica, and, in practice, the colorimetric method is frequently substituted for other more time-consuming techniques. However, total silica analysis becomes more critical in UPW, where the presence of colloidal silica is expected due to silica polymerization in the ion exchange columns. Colloidal silica is considered more critical than dissolved in the electronic industry due to the bigger impact of nano-particles in water on the semiconductor manufacturing process. Sub-ppb (parts per billion) levels of silica make it equally complex for both reactive and total silica analysis, making the choice of total silica test often preferred.

Although particles and TOC are usually measured using on-line methods, there is significant value in complementary or alternative off-line lab analysis. The value of the lab analysis has two aspects: cost and speciation. Smaller UPW facilities that cannot afford to purchase on-line instrumentation often choose off-line testing. TOC can be measured in the grab sample at a concentration as low as 5 ppb, using the same technique employed for the on-line analysis (see on-line method description). This detection level covers the majority of needs of less critical electronic and all pharmaceutical applications. When speciation of the organics is required for troubleshooting or design purposes, liquid chromatography-organic carbon detection (LC-OCD) provides an effective analysis. This method allows for identification of biopolymers, humics, low molecular weight acids and neutrals, and more, while characterizing nearly 100% of the organic composition in UPW with sub-ppb level of TOC.

Similar to TOC, SEM particle analysis represents a lower cost alternative to the expensive online measurements and therefore it is commonly a method of choice in less critical applications. SEM analysis can provide particle counting for particle size down to 50 nm, which generally is in-line with the capability of online instruments. The test involves installation of the SEM capture filter cartridge on the UPW sampling port for sampling on the membrane disk with the pore size equal or smaller than the target size of the UPW particles. The filter is then transferred to the SEM microscope where its surface is scanned for detection and identification of the particles. The main disadvantage of SEM analysis is long sampling time. Depending on the pore size and the pressure in the UPW system, the sampling time can be between one week and one month. However, typical robustness and stability of the particle filtration systems allow for successful applications of the SEM method. Application of Energy Dispersive X-ray Spectroscopy (SEM-EDS) provides compositional analysis of the particles, making SEM also helpful for systems with on-line particle counters.

Bacteria analysis is typically conducted following ASTM method F1094. The test method covers sampling and analysis of high purity water from water purification systems and water transmission systems by the direct sampling tap and filtration of the sample collected in the bag. These test methods cover both the sampling of water lines and the subsequent microbiological analysis of the sample by the culture technique. The microorganisms recovered from the water samples and counted on the filters include both aerobes and facultative anaerobes. The temperature of incubation is controlled at 28 ± 2 °C, and the period of incubation is 48 h or 72 h, if time permits. Longer incubation times are typically recommended for most critical applications. However 48 hrs is typically sufficient to detect water quality upsets.

Purification process

UPW system design for semiconductor industry

Typically, city feed-water (containing all the unwanted contaminants previously mentioned) is taken through a series of purification steps that, depending on the desired quality of UPW, includes gross filtration for large particulates, carbon filtration, water softening, reverse osmosis, exposure to ultraviolet (UV) light for TOC and/or bacterial static control, polishing by ion exchange resins or electrodeionization (EDI), and finally filtration or ultrafiltration.

Some systems use direct return, reverse return or serpentine loops that return the water to a storage area, providing continuous re-circulation, while others are single-use systems that run from point of UPW production to point of use. The constant re-circulation action in the former continuously polishes the water with every pass. The latter can be prone to contamination build up if it is left stagnant with no use.

For modern UPW systems it is important to consider specific site and process requirements such as environmental constraints (e.g., wastewater discharge limits) and reclaim opportunities (e.g., is there a mandated minimum amount of reclaim required). UPW systems consist of three subsystems: pretreatment, primary, and polishing. Most systems are similar in design but may vary in the pretreatment section depending on the nature of the source water.

Pretreatment: Pretreatment produces purified water. Typical pretreatments employed are two pass Reverse Osmosis, Demineralization plus Reverse Osmosis or HERO (High Efficiency Reverse Osmosis). In addition, the degree of filtration upstream of these processes will be dictated by the level of suspended solids, turbidity and organics present in the source water. The common types of filtration are multi-media, automatic backwashable filters and ultrafiltration for suspended solids removal and turbidity reduction and Activated Carbon for the reduction of organics. The Activated Carbon may also be used for removal of chlorine upstream of the Reverse Osmosis of Demineralization steps. If Activated Carbon is not employed then sodium bisulfite is used to de-chlorinate the feed water.

Primary: Primary treatment consists of ultraviolet light (UV) for organic reduction, EDI and or mixed bed ion exchange for demineralization. The mixed beds may be non-regenerable (following EDI), in-situ or externally regenerated. The last step in this section may be dissolved oxygen removal utilizing the membrane degasification process or vacuum degasification.

Polishing: Polishing consists of UV, heat exchange to control constant temperature in the UPW supply, non-regenerable ion exchange, membrane degasification (to polish to final UPW requirements) and ultrafiltration to achieve the required particle level. Some semiconductor Fabs require hot UPW for some of their processes. In this instance polished UPW is heated in the range of 70 to 80C before being delivered to manufacturing. Most of these systems include heat recovery wherein the excess hot UPW returned from manufacturing goes to a heat recovery unit before being returned to the UPW feed tank to conserve on the use of heating water or the need to cool the hot UPW return flow.

Key UPW design criteria for semiconductor fabrication
Remove contaminants as far forward in the system as practical and cost effective.

Steady state flow in the makeup and primary sections to avoid TOC and conductivity spikes (NO start/stop operation). Recirculate excess flow upstream.

Minimize the use of chemicals following the reverse osmosis units.

Consider EDI and non-regenerable primary mixed beds in lieu of in-situ or externally regenerated primary beds to assure optimum quality UPW makeup and minimize the potential for upset.

Select materials that will not contribute TOC and particles to the system particularly in the primary and polishing sections. Minimize stainless steel material in the polishing loop and, if used, electropolishing is recommended.

Minimize dead legs in the piping to avoid the potential for bacteria propagation.

Maintain minimum scouring velocities in the piping and distribution network to ensure turbulent flow. The recommended minimum is based on a Reynolds number of 3,000 Re or higher. This can range up to 10,000 Re depending on the comfort level of the designer.

Use only virgin resin in the polishing mixed beds. Replace every one to two years.

Supply UPW to manufacturing at constant flow and constant pressure to avoid system upsets such as particle bursts.

Utilize reverse return distribution loop design for hydraulic balance and to avoid backflow (return to supply).

Capacity considerations

Capacity plays an important role in the engineering decisions about UPW system configuration and sizing. For example, polish systems of older and smaller size electronic systems were designed for minimum flow velocity criteria of up to 60 cm (2 ft) per second at the end of pipe to avoid bacterial contamination. Larger fabs required larger size UPW systems. The figure below illustrates the increasing consumption driven by the larger size of wafer manufactured in newer fabs. However, for larger pipe (driven by higher consumption) the 60 cm (2& ft) per second criteria meant extremely high consumption and an oversized polishing system. The industry responded to this issue and through extensive investigation, choice of higher purity materials, and optimized distribution design was able to reduce the design criteria for minimum flow, using Reynolds number criteria.

The figure on the right illustrates an interesting coincidence that the largest diameter of the main supply line of UPW is equal to the size of the wafer in production (this relation is known as Klaiber's law). Growing size of the piping as well as the system overall requires new approaches to space management and process optimization. As a result, newer UPW systems look rather alike, which is in contrast with smaller UPW systems that could have less optimized design due to the lower impact of inefficiency on cost and space management.

Another capacity consideration is related to operability of the system. Small lab scale (a dozen liters-per-minute/few gallons-per-minute-capacities) systems do not typically involve operators, while large scale systems usually operate 24x7 by well trained operators. As a result, smaller systems are designed with no use of chemicals and lower water and energy efficiency than larger systems.

Critical UPW issues

Particles control
Particles in UPW are critical contaminants, which result in numerous forms of defects on wafer surfaces.  With the large volume of UPW, which comes into contact with each wafer, particle deposition on the wafer readily occurs.  Once deposited, the particles are not easily removed from the wafer surfaces.  With the increased use of dilute chemistries, particles in UPW are an issue not only with UPW rinse of the wafers, but also due to introduction of the particles during dilute wet cleans and etch, where UPW is a major constituent of the chemistry used.

Particle levels must be controlled to nm sizes, and current trends are approaching 10 nm and smaller for particle control in UPW.  While filters are used for the main loop, components of the UPW system can contribute additional particle contamination into the water, and at the point of use, additional filtration is recommended. 
 
The filters themselves must be constructed of ultraclean and robust materials, which do not contribute organics or cations/anions into the UPW, and must be integrity tested out of the factory to assure reliability and performance.  Common materials include nylon, polyethylene, polysulfone, and fluoropolymers.  Filters will commonly be constructed of a combination of polymers, and for UPW use are thermally welded without using adhesives or other contaminating additives. 
  
The microporous structure of the filter is critical in providing particle control, and this structure can be isotropic or asymmetric.  In the former case the pore distribution is uniform through the filter, while in the latter the finer surface provides the particle removal, with the coarser structure giving physical support as well reducing the overall differential pressure.

Filters can be cartridge formats where the UPW is flowed through the pleated structure with contaminants collected directly on the filter surface.  Common in UPW systems are ultrafilters (UF), composed of hollow fiber membranes.  In this configuration, the UPW is flowed across the hollow fiber, sweeping contaminants to a waste stream, known as the retentate stream.  The retentate stream is only a small percentage of the total flow, and is sent to waste.  The product water, or the permeate stream, is the UPW passing through the skin of the hollow fiber and exiting through the center of the hollow fiber.  The UF is a highly efficient filtration product for UPW, and the sweeping of the particles into the retentate stream yield extremely long life with only occasional cleaning needed.  Use of the UF in UPW systems provides excellent particle control to single digit nanometer particle sizes.

Point of use applications (POU) for UPW filtration include wet etch and clean, rinse prior to IPA vapor or liquid dry, as well as lithography dispense UPW rinse following develop.  These applications pose specific challenges for POU UPW filtration.

For wet etch and clean, most tools are single wafer processes, which require flow through the filter upon tool demand.  The resultant intermittent flow, which will range from full flow through the filter upon initiation of UPW flow through the spray nozzle, and then back to a trickle flow.  The trickle flow is typically maintained to prevent a dead leg in the tool.  The filter must be robust to withstand the pressure and low cycling, and must continue to retain captured particles throughout the service life of the filter.  This requires proper pleat design and geometry, as well as media designed to optimized particle capture and retention.  Certain tools may use a fixed filter housing with replaceable filters, whereas other tools may use disposable filter capsules for the POU UPW.

For lithography applications, small filter capsules are used.  Similar to the challenges for wet etch and clean POU UPW applications, for lithography UPW rinse, the flow through the filter is intermittent, though at a low flow and pressure, so the physical robustness is not as critical.  Another POU UPW application for lithography is the immersion water used at the lens/wafer interface for 193 nm immersion lithography patterning.  The UPW forms a puddle between the lens and the wafer, improving NA, and the UPW must be extremely pure. POU filtration is used on the UPW just prior to the stepper scanner.

For POU UPW applications, sub 15 nm filters are currently in use for advanced 2x and 1x nodes.  The filters are commonly made of nylon, high-density polyethylene (HDPE), polyarylsulfone (or polysulfone), or  polytetrafluoroethylene (PTFE) membranes, with hardware typically consisting of HDPE or PFA.

Point of use (POU) treatment for organics
Point of use treatment is often applied in critical tool applications such as Immersion lithography and Mask preparation in order to maintain consistent ultrapure water quality. UPW systems located in the central utilities building provide the Fab with quality water but may not provide adequate water purification consistency for these processes.

In the case when urea, THM, isopropyl alcohol (IPA) or other difficult to remove (low molecular weight neutral compounds) TOC species may be present, additional treatment is required thru advanced oxidation process (AOP) using systems.  This is particularly important when tight TOC specification below 1 ppb is required to be attained. These difficult to control organics have been proven to impact yield and device performance especially at the most demanding process steps. One of the successful examples of the POU organics control down to 0.5 ppb TOC level is AOP combining ammonium persulfate and UV oxidation (refer to the persulfate+UV oxidation chemistry in the TOC measurement section).

Available proprietary POU advanced oxidation processes can consistently reduce TOC to 0.5 parts per billion (ppb) in addition to maintaining consistent temperature, oxygen and particles exceeding the SEMI F063 requirements. This is important because the slightest variation can directly affect the manufacturing process, significantly influencing product yields.

UPW recycling in the semiconductor industry

The semiconductor industry uses a large amount of ultrapure water to rinse contaminants from the surface of the silicon wafers that are later turned into computer chips. The ultrapure water is by definition extremely low in contamination, but once it makes contact with the wafer surface it carries residual chemicals or particles from the surface that then end up in the industrial waste treatment system of the manufacturing facility. The contamination level of the rinse water can vary a great deal depending on the particular process step that is being rinsed at the time. A "first rinse" step may carry a large amount of residual contaminants and particles compared to a last rinse that may carry relatively low amounts of contamination. Typical semiconductor plants have only two drain systems for all of these rinses which are also combined with acid waste and therefore the rinse water is not effectively reused due to risk of contamination causing manufacturing process defects.

As noted above, ultrapure water is commonly not recycled in semiconductor applications, but rather reclaimed in other processes. There is one company in the US, Exergy Systems, Inc. of Irvine, California, that offers a patented deionized water recycling process.  This product has been successfully tested at a number of semiconductor processes.

Definitions:

The following definitions are used by ITRS:

UPW Recycle – Water reuse in the same application after treatment
Water Reuse – Use in secondary application
Water Reclaim – Extracting water from wastewater

Water reclaim and recycle:

Some semiconductor manufacturing plants have been using reclaimed water for non-process applications such as chemical aspirators where the discharge water is sent to industrial waste. Water reclamation is also a typical application where spent rinse water from the manufacturing facility may be used in cooling tower supply, exhaust scrubber supply, or point of use abatement systems. UPW Recycling is not as typical and involves collecting the spent manufacturing rinse water, treating it and re-using it back in the wafer rinse process. Some additional water treatment may be required for any of these cases depending on the quality of the spent rinse water and the application of the reclaimed water. These are fairly common practices in many semiconductor facilities worldwide, however there is a limitation to how much water can be reclaimed and recycled if not considering reuse in the manufacturing process.

UPW recycling:

Recycling rinse water from the semiconductor manufacturing process has been discouraged by many manufacturing engineers for decades because of the risk that the contamination from the chemical residue and particles may end up back in the UPW feed water  and result in product defects. Modern Ultrapure Water systems are very effective at removing ionic contamination down to parts per trillion levels (ppt) whereas organic contamination of ultrapure water systems is still in the parts per billion levels (ppb). In any case recycling the process water rinses for UPW makeup has always been a great concern and until recently this was not a common practice. Increasing water and wastewater costs in parts of the US and Asia have pushed some semiconductor companies to investigate the recycling of manufacturing process rinse water in the UPW makeup system.  Some companies have incorporated an approach that uses complex large scale treatment designed for worst case conditions of the combined waste water discharge. More recently new approaches have been developed to incorporate a detailed water management plan to try to minimize the treatment system cost and complexity.

Water management plan:

The key to maximizing water reclaim, recycle, and reuse is having a well thought out water management plan. A successful water management plan includes full understanding of how the rinse waters are used in the manufacturing process including chemicals used and their byproducts. With the development of this critical component, a drain collection system can be designed to segregate concentrated chemicals from moderately contaminated rinse waters, and lightly contaminated rinse waters. Once segregated into separate collection systems the once considered chemical process waste streams can be repurposed or sold as a product stream, and the rinse waters can be reclaimed.

A water management plan will also require a significant amount of sample data and analysis to determine proper drain segregation, application of online analytical measurement, diversions control, and final treatment technology. Collecting these samples and performing laboratory analysis can help characterize the various waste streams and determine the potential of their respective re-use. In the case of UPW process rinse water the lab analysis data can then be used to profile typical and non-typical levels of contamination which then can be used to design the rinse water treatment system. In general it is most cost effective to design the system to treat the typical level of contamination that may occur 80-90% of the time, then incorporate on-line sensors and controls to divert the rinse water to industrial waste or to non-critical use such as cooling towers when the contamination level exceeds the capability of the treatment system. By incorporating all these aspects of a water management plan in a semiconductor manufacturing site the level of water use can be reduced by as much as 90%.

Transport

Stainless steel remains a piping material of choice for the pharmaceutical industry.  Due to its metallic contribution, most steel was removed from microelectronics UPW systems in the 1980s and replaced with high performance polymers of polyvinylidene fluoride (PVDF), perfluoroalkoxy (PFA), ethylene chlorotrifluoroethylene (ECTFE) and polytetrafluoroethylene (PTFE) in the US and Europe.  In Asia, polyvinyl chloride (PVC), chlorinated polyvinyl chloride (CPVC) and polypropylene (PP) are popular, along with the high performance polymers.

Methods of joining thermoplastics used for UPW transport

Thermoplastics can be joined by different thermofusion techniques.

Socket fusion (SF) is a process where the outside diameter of the pipe uses a "close fit" match to the inner diameter of a fitting.  Both pipe and fitting are heated on a bushing (outer and inner, respectively) for a prescribed period of time.  Then the pipe is pressed into the fitting.   Upon cooling the welded parts are removed from the clamp.
Conventional butt fusion (CBF) is a process where the two components to be joined have the same inner and outer diameters.  The ends are heated by pressing them against the opposite sides of a heater plate for a prescribed period of time.  Then the two components are brought together.  Upon cooling the welded parts are removed from the clamp.
Bead and crevice free (BCF), uses a process of placing two thermoplastic components having the same inner and outer diameters together.  Next an inflatable bladder is introduced in the inner bore of the components and placed equidistance within the two components.  A heater head clamps the components together and the bladder is inflated.  After a prescribed period of time the heater head begins to cool and the bladder deflates.  Once completely cooled the bladder is removed and the joined components are taken out of the clamping station.  The benefit of the BCF system is that there is no weld bead, meaning that the surface of the weld zone is routinely as smooth as the inner wall of the pipe.      
Infrared fusion (IR) is a process similar to CBF except that the component ends never touch the heater head.  Instead, the energy to melt the thermoplastic is transferred by radiant heat.  IR comes in two variations; one uses overlap distance when bringing the two components together while the other uses pressure.  The use of overlap in the former reduces the variation seen in bead size, meaning that precise dimensional tolerances needed for industrial installations can be maintained better.

References

Notes

References

Water
Water treatment
Liquid water
Semiconductor device fabrication